Dieter Friedrich is a retired slalom canoeist who competed for East Germany from the mid-1950s to the early 1960s. He won eight medals at the ICF Canoe Slalom World Championships with four golds (C-2: 1957, 1959; C-2 team: 1959, 1961), two silvers (C-2: 1955, C-2 team: 1955) and a bronze (C-2: 1961, C-2 team: 1957).

References

German male canoeists
Possibly living people
Year of birth missing (living people)
Medalists at the ICF Canoe Slalom World Championships